The 1989–90 Ohio Bobcats men's basketball team represented Ohio University in the college basketball season of 1989–90. The team was coached by Larry Hunter in his first season and played their home games at the Convocation Center.

Schedule

|-
!colspan=9 style=| Non-conference regular season

|-
!colspan=9 style=| MAC regular season

|-

|-
!colspan=9 style=| MAC Tournament

Source:

Statistics

Team Statistics
Final 1989–90 Statistics

Source

Player statistics

Source

References

General
Ohio Record Book 
NCAA.org

Ohio Bobcats men's basketball seasons
Ohio
1989 in sports in Ohio
Bob